The Career Center is a high school located in Winston-Salem, North Carolina. It offers an extension to the regular high school program. Classes offered include Advanced Placement courses, career and technical education (CTE) courses, English, and classes too small to be held at the regular high schools in the Winston-Salem/Forsyth County Schools program, such as Japanese and Chinese. It also offers extended day classes, which are held after school that allow students to "make up" a failed class in order to graduate. It moved to a new facility in January 2012 after a bond vote sold its previous facility to Forsyth Tech.

Student schedule

The bell schedule is as follows:

*Transportation to and from home schools is provided at this time.

Student life

The Career Center offers a unique experience for the students that choose to attend it. Career classes have contracted with local businesses such as electricians for students with hands-on experience that are interested in working after high school. Many teachers at Career Center are experts in their fields , some of whom have taught their class since its inception. The CTE courses work hands on in the fields they are studying. For example, the Auto Tech class will actually repair vehicles, either from the school system or from people who volunteer to take them there, for free, the Early Childhood Education course actually operates a daycare, Teacher Cadet students will work in elementary schools during their second semester, the Construction Technology class constructs a house every year for Habitat for Humanity, and the Advanced-level cosmetology students will actually take customers.

Beyond academics, Career Center also provides a collegiate atmosphere for students. Students enrolled in the AP classes strive to achieve higher than those found at normal high schools. Many students are granted travel periods to extend time management responsibilities while providing time to study, socialize, or relax. Because of the nature of the program, with most kids only attending the school for part of the day, the school does not offer regular meals. Food may, however, be purchased from the Culinary Arts class.

Despite its non-traditional setting, several clubs exist at Career Center, including Robotics Club, Physics Club, and HOSA.

Since the Career Center is not a main high school in the WS/FCS system, it devotes a certain amount of time to attracting new students. Recent items include bumper stickers, glow-in-the-dark T-shirts, carabiners, and hoodies with the Career Center logo on it. The Career Center sends seniors to the main high schools in the system with presentations to entice rising sophomores and juniors to apply for classes there.

Career-related classes
The career center offers classes related to specific fields. These classes, usually about 1.5 hours (two periods) long, are designed to help students gain a better understanding in that specific field, and better prepares them for it. They are taught by professionals in that specific industry. They include:
Agricultural Work Development
Allied Health Sciences
Auto Collision Repair
Automotive Technology
Auto Service Technology
Aviation Technology
Carpentry
Chinese Language
CISCO Networking
Commercial Art
Computer Information Systems
Cosmetology
Culinary Arts
Early Childhood Education
Electricity
Electronic Music
Electronics
Landscape Maintenance
Photography
Radio Broadcasting
Television Broadcasting

AP classes
These classes are more difficult, considering they are on a college level. Students can receive college credit for these classes only if they take the AP exam at the end of the year. Career Center has a higher percentage of students achieve proficient scores (a score of 3 or above) than both the national and state averages on almost all AP exams.
AP Studio Art Drawing
AP Art History
AP Studio Art 2D
AP Studio Art 3D
AP Biology
AP Calculus AB
AP Calculus BC
AP Chemistry
AP Chinese Language and Culture
AP Computer Science A
AP English Language and Composition
AP English Literature and Composition
AP Environmental Science
AP European History
AP French Language
AP German Language
AP United States Government and Politics
AP Comparative Government and Politics
AP Human Geography
AP Japanese Language and Culture
AP Macroeconomics
AP Microeconomics
AP Music Theory
AP Physics B
AP Physics C: Mechanics
AP Physics C: Electricity and Magnetism
AP Psychology
AP Spanish Language
AP Spanish Literature
AP Statistics
AP United States History
AP World History

Move
The Career Center's facilities were moved during the 1st semester of the 2011–2012 school year.

Forsyth County passed an educational bond in the fall of 2008 providing the money for Forsyth Tech to purchase the building that currently houses the Career Center and the WS/FCS Administrative Center.

The administrative center was also moved to two buildings previously occupied by HanesBrands north of town off Hanes Mill Road.

A new and larger Career Center was built on the site where Kennedy Middle School currently sits. This campus now houses three separate educational programs. The current Kennedy building remained and was remodeled to become a career technical high school. Carter Vocational High School was built on the southwest corner of the site. In addition, two buildings now house the Career Center. A three-story 'L-shaped' building housing mostly the Advanced Placement, regular, and honors classes was constructed on the southeast corner, and a two-story 'U-shaped' building housing most of the CTE courses was built north of the three-story building.

References

External links
Career Center Website
WS/FCS Website

High schools in Winston-Salem, North Carolina
Public high schools in North Carolina